Walter Gittins (1865 – after 1890) was an English professional footballer who made 21 appearances in the Football Alliance playing for Small Heath.

Gittins was born in Aston, which is now part of Birmingham. He began his football career with Lozells Sports Club before joining Small Heath for their first season in the Football Alliance in September 1889. A solid, powerful full back, Gittins made his debut on 14 September 1889 in a 2–2 draw at home to Bootle, and was ever-present for the rest of that season, at the end of which he joined Stafford Rangers.

References

1865 births
Year of death missing
Footballers from Birmingham, West Midlands
English footballers
Association football fullbacks
Birmingham City F.C. players
Stafford Rangers F.C. players
Date of birth missing
Football Alliance players